The Belcina (also: Belchia) is a right tributary of the river Mureș in Transylvania, Romania. It flows through the town Gheorgheni, and joins the Mureș near the village Joseni.

References

Rivers of Romania
Rivers of Harghita County